Bohuslav Pilný (born 22 March 1973) is a Czech football manager and former player. He played in the top flight of his country, making more than 200 appearances spanning the existence of the Czechoslovak First League and the Czech First League.

Coaching career
Following his playing career, he took charge of FK Nová Paka and later Bohemian Football League club SK Převýšov. He left Převýšov in December 2008. In January 2009, he became manager of FK Kolín.

before later being announced as the manager of Czech First League side FC Hradec Králové.

He was appointed as head coach/manager of Viktoria Žižkov in October 2017, however his position was terminated at the end of May 2018.

Following a spell at 1. FK Příbram as an assistant manager, Pilný was appointed manager of FK Baník Sokolov on 13 December 2019.

Honours

Club
 Slovan Liberec
Czech Cup: 1999–2000
 Gambrinus liga: 2001–02

References

External links
 Bohuslav Pilný at Soccerway

1973 births
Living people
Czech footballers
Czechoslovak footballers
Czech First League players
FC Hradec Králové players
FC Slovan Liberec players
Czech football managers
FC Hradec Králové managers
FK Viktoria Žižkov managers
FK Baník Sokolov managers
Czech First League managers
Association football defenders
FK Dukla Prague managers
Czech National Football League managers